João Donato de Oliveira Neto is a Brazilian jazz and bossa nova pianist from Brazil. He first worked with Altamiro Carrilho and went on to perform with Antonio Carlos Jobim and Astrud Gilberto.

Career
A professional at the age of 15, Donato played accordion at the Sinatra-Farney Fan Club.

He recorded for the first time with Altamiro Carrilho. Soon after he joined a band led by violinist Fafá Lemos that played in Brazilian nightclubs.  His first solo album came out in 1953. He led the bossa nova band Os Namorados  which performed songs such as "Tenderly".

Donato became arranger and pianist for the band Garotos da Lua and was joined by João Gilberto. After moving to São Paulo, he played in the Luís César Orchestra and the band Os Copacabanas. In 1956 he recorded an album for Odeon that was produced by Antonio Carlos Jobim. Donato wrote "Minha Saudade" with Gilberto, and it became a hit. In an interview during the 1970s, Gilberto said Donato inspired the creation of bossa nova.

Jobs at nightclubs decreased when customers said they couldn't dance to his music. Musicians, too, found the music difficult to learn. Unable to find work in his home country, he left Brazil after his friend Nanai, a former member of Os Namorados, offered him a job in the U.S. During the next decade, he recorded with Mongo Santamaria, Tito Puente, Astrud Gilberto, Bud Shank, and Cal Tjader. His hits included "A Rã," and "Caranguejo", both recorded by Sergio Mendes. His album A Bad Donato (1970) was recorded with jazz bassist Ron Carter. He was music director for Gal Costa in 1974.

Awards and honors
Alexandre Carvalho dos Santos wrote, "I recommend a João Donato gig not only to someone who is interested in first class music, an impressive pianist and a selection of historic compositions. I recommend it to anyone who needs an anti-depressive, an acupuncture session or any such other form of deep relaxation. I had my dose on a Sunday evening, from a show in São Paulo. A perfect timing to start a week believing that happiness exists, in spite of your boss". In 2010, Sambolero, credited to the João Donato Trio, earned the Latin Grammy for Best Latin Jazz Album at the 10th Latin Grammy Awards.

In 2016, he was nominated for the Latin Grammy Award for Best Instrumental Album for his album Donato Elétrico. The album was also chosen by the Brazilian edition of Rolling Stone magazine as the 11th best Brazilian album of 2016. His album Sintetizamor was named by Rolling Stone Brasil one of the best of 2017.

Discography

As leader
 A Bossa Muito Moderna De Donato E Seu Trio (Polydor, 1963)
 The New Sound of Brazil (RCA Victor, 1965)
 Sambou Sambou (Pacific Jazz, 1965)
 A Bad Donato (Blue Thumb, 1970)
 Quem e Quem (Odeon, 1973)
 DonatoDeodato (Muse, 1973)
 Lugar Comum (Philips, 1975)
 Leilíadas (Elektra Musician, 1986)
 Coisas tão simples (Odeon, 1995)
 Café com Pão with Eloir de Moraes (Lumiar Discos, 1997)
 Só Danço Samba (Lumiar Discos, 1999)
 Remando Na Raia (Lumiar Discos, 2001)
 Ê Lalá Lay-Ê (DeckDisc, 2001)
 Managarroba (Deckdisc, 2002)
 Wanda Sá Com João Donato (Deckdisc, 2003)
 A Blue Donato (Whatmusic, 2005)
 João Donato Reecontra Maria Tita (Lumiar Discos, 2006)
 Dois Panos para Manga with Paulo Moura (Biscoito Fino, 2006)
 Uma Tarde Com Bud Shank e João Donato (Biscoito Fino, 2007)
 O Piano De João Donato (Deckdisc, 2007)
 Donatural (Biscoito Fino, 2009)
 Água with Paula Morelenbaum (Biscoito Fino, 2010)
 Live Jazz in Rio Vol 1 - O Couro Ta Comendo! (Discobertas, 2014)
 Donato Elétrico (Selo, 2016)
 Sintetizamor (Polysom, 2017)
 Raridades (Anos 70) (Discobertas, 2018)
 Gozando  Existência (Discobertas, 2018)

As sideman

With Vinicius Cantuária
 Siga-Me (EMI, 1985)
 Samba Carioca (Naïve, 2010)

With Nana Caymmi
 Renascer (1976)
 Nana (1977)

With Gal Costa
 Cantar (Philips, 1974)
 Gal Canta Caymmi (Philips, 1976)
 Estratosférica (Sony, 2015)

With Bebel Gilberto
 Tanto Tempo (Ziriguiboom, 2000)
 Bebel Gilberto (Ziriguiboom, 2004)

With Joyce
 Tudo Bonito (Epic, 2000)
 Bossa Duets (Sony, 2003)
 Aquarius (2009)

With Marisa Monte
 Memories, Chronicles, and Declarations of Love (Metro Blue, 2000)
 Infinito Particular (EMI, 2006)

With Cal Tjader
 The Prophet (Verve, 1968)
 Solar Heat (Skye, 1968)
 Sounds Out Burt Bacharach (Skye, 1969)

With others
 João Bosco, Linha e Passe (RCA Victor, 1979)
 Celso Fonseca, Liebe Paradiso (Dubas, 2011)
 Michael Franks, Sleeping Gypsy (Warner Bros., 1977)
 Astrud Gilberto, The Astrud Gilberto Album (Verve, 1965)
 João Gilberto, Chega De Saudade (2010)
 Toninho Horta, Cape Horn  (2007)
 Marcelinho da Lua, Tranqüilo (Deckdisc, 2003)
 Jorge Mautner, Bomba de Estrelas  (Warner Bros., 1981)
 Sergio Mendes, Sergio Mendes' Favorite Things (Atlantic, 1968)
 Miúcha & Tom Jobim, Miucha & Tom Jobim (RCA Victor, 1979)
 Paula Morelenbaum, Telecoteco (Universal, 2008)
 Milton Nascimento, Clube da Esquina 2 (EMI, 1978)
 Lisa Ono, Minha Saudade (Nana 1995)
 Eddie Palmieri, La Perfecta (Alegre, 1962)
 Dom Um Romão, Dom Um Romão (Muse, 1974)
 Emílio Santiago, Emílio Santiago (CID, 1975)
 Moacir Santos, Ouro Negro (Universal, 2001)
 Bud Shank, Bud Shank & His Brazilian Friends (Pacific Jazz, 1965)
 Robertinho Silva, Bodas de Prata (CBS, 1989)
 Raul de Souza, Bossa Eterna  (Biscoito Fino, 2008)
 Caetano Veloso, Qualquer Coisa (Philips, 1975)
 Nara Leão, Os Meus Amigos São Um Barato (Philips, 1977)

References

External links
João Donato – comprehensive site, including discography

1934 births
Living people
Brazilian jazz pianists
Bossa nova pianists
People from Rio Branco, Acre
Latin Grammy Award winners
Latin Grammy Lifetime Achievement Award winners
Brazilian composers
Latin music composers
21st-century pianists
Blue Thumb Records artists